Denis Hale Johnson (July 1, 1949 – May 24, 2017) was an American novelist, short-story writer, and poet. He is perhaps best known for his debut short story collection, Jesus' Son (1992). His most successful novel, Tree of Smoke (2007), won the National Book Award for Fiction. His other novels include Angels (1983), Fiskadoro (1985), The Stars at Noon (1986), Resuscitation of a Hanged Man (1991), Already Dead: A California Gothic (1997), The Name of the World (2000), Nobody Move (2009), Train Dreams (2011), and The Laughing Monsters (2014). Johnson was twice shortlisted for the Pulitzer Prize for Fiction. His final work, a book of short stories titled The Largesse of the Sea Maiden, was published posthumously in 2018. Johnson also wrote plays, journalism, and nonfiction.

Early years
Denis Johnson was born on July 1, 1949, in Munich, West Germany. Growing up, he also lived in the Philippines, Japan, and the suburbs of Washington, D.C. His father, Alfred Johnson, worked for the State Department as a liaison between the USIA and the CIA. His mother, the former Vera Louise Childress, was a homemaker. He earned a B.A. in English (in 1971) from the University of Iowa and an M.F.A. (in 1974) from the Iowa Writers' Workshop, where he also returned to teach. While at the Writers' Workshop, Johnson took classes from Raymond Carver.

Career
Johnson published his first book, a collection of poetry titled The Man Among Seals, in 1969 at the age of 19. He earned a measure of acclaim with the publication of his first novel, Angels, in 1983. He came to prominence in 1992 with the short story collection Jesus' Son, which included vignettes originally published in The New Yorker, inspired by Isaac Babel’s book Red Cavalry. In a 2006 New York Times Book Review poll, Jesus' Son was voted one of the best works of American fiction published in the last 25 years. It has been variously described as: seminal, legendary, transcendent, a classic, and a masterpiece. It was adapted into the 1999 film of the same name, which starred Billy Crudup. Johnson has a cameo role in the film as a man who has been stabbed in the eye by his wife.

The Stars at Noon (1986), a spy thriller, follows an unnamed American woman during the Nicaraguan Revolution of 1984. It was adapted into the 2022 film Stars at Noon by director Claire Denis, starring Joe Alwyn and Margaret Qualley.

Tree of Smoke won the 2007 National Book Award for Fiction and was a finalist for the 2008 Pulitzer Prize for Fiction. It takes place during the Vietnam War, spanning the years 1963–70, with a coda set in 1983. In the novel, we learn the history of Bill Houston, a main character in Johnson’s first novel Angels, the latter novel set in the early 1980s.

Train Dreams, originally published as a story in The Paris Review in 2002, was published as a novella in 2011 and was a finalist for the 2012 Pulitzer Prize for Fiction. However, for the first time since 1977, the Pulitzer board did not award a prize for fiction that year.

Johnson's plays have been produced in San Francisco, Chicago, New York, and Seattle. He was the Resident Playwright of Campo Santo, the resident theater company at Intersection for the Arts in San Francisco. In 2006 and 2007, Johnson held the Mitte Chair in Creative Writing at Texas State University in San Marcos, Texas. Johnson also occasionally taught at the Michener Center for Writers at the University of Texas at Austin.

Altogether, Johnson was the author of  nine novels, one novella, two books of short stories, three collections of poetry, two collections of plays, and one book of reportage. The final book he published while still alive was a novel, The Laughing Monsters, which he called a "literary thriller" set in Uganda, Sierra Leone, and Congo. It was released on November 4, 2014. Johnson's final work, a book of short stories titled The Largesse of the Sea Maiden, was published posthumously in January 2018.

Personal life
Johnson was twice divorced and lived with his third wife, Cindy Lee, in Phoenix, Arizona, at the time of his death. They also shared a home in Idaho. Johnson had three children, two of whom he homeschooled; in October 1997, he wrote an article for the website Salon in defense of homeschooling.

For most of his twenties, Johnson was addicted to drugs and alcohol and did not do much writing. In 1978, he moved back to his parents' home in Scottsdale, Arizona, to sober up and find direction. He stopped drinking alcohol in 1978 and quit recreational drugs in 1983.

In his essay "Bikers for Jesus," Johnson described himself as "a Christian convert, but one of the airy, sophisticated kind."

Death
Johnson died on May 24, 2017, from liver cancer at his home in The Sea
Ranch, a community near Gualala, California, at the age of 67.

Awards
 1981 – National Poetry Series award (selected by Mark Strand), for The Incognito Lounge
 1983 – The Frost Place poet in residence
 1986 – Guggenheim Fellowship
 1986 – Whiting Award
 1993 – Lannan Fellowship in Fiction
 2002 – Aga Khan Prize for Fiction from The Paris Review, for Train Dreams
 2007 – National Book Award, for Tree of Smoke
 2008 – Pulitzer Prize for Fiction finalist, for Tree of Smoke
 2012 – Pulitzer Prize for Fiction finalist, for Train Dreams
 2017 – Library of Congress Prize for American Fiction (awarded posthumously)

Bibliography

Novels
 Angels (Knopf, 1983)  Fiskadoro (Knopf, 1985) 
 The Stars at Noon (Knopf, 1986) 
 Resuscitation of a Hanged Man (Farrar, Straus & Giroux [FSG], 1991) 
 Already Dead: A California Gothic (Harper Collins, 1997) 
 The Name of the World (Harper, 2000) 
 Tree of Smoke (FSG, 2007) 
 Nobody Move (FSG, 2009)
 Train Dreams (FSG, 2011) – a novella first published in The Paris Review [2002] and in Europe [2004] The Laughing Monsters (FSG, 2014) 

 Short fiction 
 Jesus' Son (FSG, 1992) 
 The Largesse of the Sea Maiden (Penguin/Random House, 2018) 

Poetry
 The Man Among the Seals: Poems (Stone Wall Press, 1969) 
 Inner Weather (Graywolf Press, 1976) 
 The Incognito Lounge and Other Poems (Random House, 1982) 
 The Veil (Alfred A. Knopf, 1987)  
 The Throne of the Third Heaven of the Nations Millennium General Assembly: Poems Collected and New (Harper Perennial, 1995) 
 "Last Night I Dreamed I Was in Mexico" (Ploughshares 36.4, 2010, p. 58)
 "The Trees Leaning into One Another, Green and Horrible" (Ploughshares 36.4, 2010, p. 59)

Plays
 Hellhound on My Trail: A Drama in Three Parts (2000)
 Shoppers: Two Plays (Harper, 2002) - includes Hellhound on My Trail Des Moines, San Francisco premiere in October 2007
 Des Moines, New York premiere in November 2022
 Soul of a Whore and Purvis: Two Plays in Verse (FSG, 2012) 

Screenplays
 The Prom (1990) (directed by Steven Shainberg)
 Hit Me (1996) (directed by Steven Shainberg, adapted from the novel A Swell-Looking Babe by Jim Thompson)

Nonfiction
 (contributor)  One Man By Himself: Portraits of John Serl (Hard Press, 1995) 
 
 
 
 
 
 
 Seek: Reports from the Edges of America & Beyond'' (essays) (HarperCollins, 2001)

References

External links 
 Denis Johnson Papers at the Harry Ransom Center
 
 
 Intersection for the Arts, San Francisco
 KCRW Bookworm Interview
 Profile at The Whiting Foundation
 Denis Johnson profile and poems at Academy of American Poets
 Denis Johnson at Library of Congress Authorities — with 25 catalog records

1949 births
2017 deaths
20th-century American dramatists and playwrights
20th-century American novelists
20th-century American poets
20th-century American short story writers
20th-century American male writers
21st-century American dramatists and playwrights
21st-century American novelists
21st-century American poets
21st-century American short story writers
21st-century American male writers
American male dramatists and playwrights
American male novelists
American male poets
American male short story writers
Deaths from cancer in California
Deaths from liver cancer
Iowa Writers' Workshop alumni
National Book Award winners
PEN/Faulkner Award for Fiction winners
Postmodern writers
The New Yorker people
O. Henry Award winners